Ahmad ibn al-Tayyib al-Sarakhsi (died 899 CE) was a Persian traveler, historian and philosopher from the city of Sarakhs. He was a pupil of al-Kindi.

Al-Sarakhsi was killed by Caliph al-Mu'tadid because, according to an anecdote preserved in Yaqut al-Hamawi's Mu'jam al-Udaba''', he had urged the caliph towards apostasy. Al-Biruni reports in his Chronology'' that al-Sarakhsi had written books in which he denounced prophecy and ridiculed the prophets, whom he styled charlatans. However, Rosenthal has disputed the historicity of the stories that claim al-Sarakhsi was executed for heretical beliefs.

References

899 deaths
Islamic philosophers
Arabic commentators on Aristotle
9th-century Iranian philosophers
Travel writers of the medieval Islamic world
9th-century Iranian historians
Year of birth unknown
9th-century executions by the Abbasid Caliphate
Iranian historians of Islam
9th-century travelers